Piermont is the name of two places in the United States of America:

 Piermont, New Hampshire
 Piermont, New York

See also
 Piedmont
 Piedmont (United States)